Clostridium saccharobutylicum is an indole and notably acetone, butanol and ethanol-producing bacterium, with type strain DSM 13864T (= ATCC BAA-117T). Its genome has been sequenced.

References

Further reading
 
 Law, Laurent. Production of biobutanol from white grape pomace by Clostridium saccharobutylicum using submerged fermentation. Diss. AUT University, 2010.

External links
 
 LPSN
 Type strain of Clostridium saccharobutylicum at BacDive -  the Bacterial Diversity Metadatabase

Gram-positive bacteria
Bacteria described in 2001
saccharobutylicum